Paint is an upcoming American comedy film written and directed by Brit McAdams. The film stars Owen Wilson, Michaela Watkins, Wendi McLendon-Covey, Ciara Renée, Lucy Freyer, Lusia Strus, and Stephen Root. The film is scheduled to be released on April 7, 2023, by IFC Films.

Premise
The film centers on Carl Nargle, who has hosted Vermont's number one painting show for nearly three decades. While Carl's signature whisper has long kept viewers from Pittsfield to St. Albans breathlessly hanging on his every stroke, the station eventually hires a younger, better painter who steals everything (and everyone) Carl loves.

Cast
 Owen Wilson as Carl Nargle, a fictional character based on Bob Ross
 Michaela Watkins 
 Wendi McLendon-Covey 
 Ciara Renée 
 Lusia Strus
 Stephen Root 
 Lucy Freyer 
 Denny Dillon
 Evander Duck Jr.
 Will Blagrove
 Ryan Czerwonko

Production
In 2010, the screenplay Paint, written by Brit McAdams, was featured on the Black List of that year's most-liked unproduced screenplays. On April 16, 2021, it was announced that Owen Wilson, Michaela Watkins, Wendi McLendon-Covey, Ciara Renée, Lusia Strus, and Stephen Root have signed on to star in the film, which McAdams would also direct. In May 2021, it was announced that Lucy Freyer would also star.

Principal photography took place from April 2021 to June 2021 in Albany, New York.

Release
Paint was originally set to be released by IFC Films on April 28, 2023, but was moved to April 7, 2023. The film will stream exclusively on AMC+ in the United States later in 2023.

References

External links
 
 
 
 
 

Upcoming films
2023 comedy films
2023 independent films
American comedy films
American independent films
Films about fictional painters
Films scored by Lyle Workman
Films set in Vermont
Films shot in New York (state)
IFC Films films